Darrell Weaver (born March 15, 1962) is an American politician who has served in the Oklahoma Senate from the 24th district since 2018. Weaver served 28 years in law enforcement serving his last nine years as the Director of the Oklahoma Bureau of Narcotics. In 2015 he was inducted into the Oklahoma Law Enforcement Hall of Fame. Weaver is married to Kim, a Medical Doctor and they have five children.

References

1962 births
Living people
Republican Party Oklahoma state senators
21st-century American politicians